Malangen or Malangsfjorden ( and ) is a fjord in Troms og Finnmark county, Norway. The fjord runs southeast between the islands of Senja and Kvaløya and further into the mainland along the border between Balsfjord and Lenvik municipalities.

The fjord stretches from Hekkingen Lighthouse off the coast of the island of Senja to the village of Nordfjordbotn. In the inner part of the fjord, it branches out into four smaller fjords: Nordfjorden, Aursfjorden, Målselvfjorden, and Rossfjorden. The Målselva river feeds into the Målselvfjorden. There are several larger villages along the coast of the fjord, including Mortenhals, Mestervik, and Rossfjordstraumen.

Etymology
The name Malangen is from the Old Norse word mál which means "bag" and it refers to the baggy shape of the fjord. The same word mál is also the origin of the name of the Målselva, the big river that enters the fjord from the Målselvdalen and Bardu valleys. The second element of the name angr which means "inlet" or "fjord".

History
Historically, the fjord along with the area around it has had a historical importance as the northern boundary for Norwegian settlement during the Middle ages. In the 13th century, King Haakon IV of Norway gave some people from Bjarmaland some land around the Malangen fjord on which to live. From 1871 until 1964, the area surrounding much of the fjord was part of the municipality of Malangen.

See also
 List of Norwegian fjords

References

Fjords of Troms og Finnmark
Balsfjord
Senja
Målselv
Tromsø